Karolina Anna Michalczuk (born 6 December 1979) is a world champion boxer, and twice European champion. She was born in Brzezice, a village in eastern Poland. Her club is Paco Lublin.

She represented Poland in the 2012 Summer Olympics taking place in London in the flyweight division. She lost in the Round of 16 to India's Mary Kom 14-19.

References

External links
 AIBA London 2012 Profile

1979 births
Polish women boxers
Olympic boxers of Poland
Boxers at the 2012 Summer Olympics
Living people
People from Świdnik County
Sportspeople from Lublin Voivodeship
AIBA Women's World Boxing Championships medalists
Flyweight boxers
20th-century Polish women
21st-century Polish women